A special election was held in  on May 10, 1813 to fill a vacancy left by the resignation of Duncan McArthur (DR) on April 5, 1813 before Congress assembled.

Election results

Creighton took his seat June 15, 1813

See also
List of special elections to the United States House of Representatives

References

Special elections to the 13th United States Congress
1813 03
Ohio 1813 03
Ohio 03
1813 Ohio elections
United States House of Representatives 1813 03